Fissurella limbata is a species of sea snail, a marine gastropod mollusk in the family Fissurellidae, the keyhole limpets and slit limpets.

Distribution
This marine species occurs in the Pacific from Peru to the Strait of Magelhaen.

Description
The size of the shell varies between 33 mm and 70 mm.

References

External links
 Sowerby, G. B., I; Sowerby, G. B., II. (1832-1841). The conchological illustrations or, Coloured figures of all the hitherto unfigured recent shells. London, privately published
 McLean J.H. (1984) Systematics of Fissurella in the Peruvian and Magellanic faunal provinces (Gastropoda: Prosobranchia). Contributions in Science, Natural History Museum of Los Angeles County 354: 1-70 
 Petit, R. E. (2009). George Brettingham Sowerby, I, II & III: their conchological publications and molluscan taxa. Zootaxa. 2189: 1–218
 To Biodiversity Heritage Library (20 publications)
 To GenBank (14 nucleotides; 14 proteins)
 To World Register of Marine Species
 

Fissurellidae
Gastropods described in 1835